Lampiella gibbosa is a species of armored catfish endemic to Brazil where it is found in the Ribeira de Iguape River basin. This species is the only recognized member of its genus. This species grows to a length of  TL.

The genus Lampiella Isbrücker 2001  was named in honor of Isbrücker’s grandmother, Céline Lampie (1886-1943), who was murdered at the German extermination camp in Sobibor, Poland, She was “a small woman with a small humpback” (translation), alluding to the humpbacked shape of Lampiella gibbosa.

References
 

Loricariidae
Fish of South America
Fish of Brazil
Endemic fauna of Brazil
Taxa named by Isaäc J. H. Isbrücker
Monotypic freshwater fish genera
Catfish genera